Piribeg is a mountain peak located between Kosovo and North Macedonia. Piribeg reaches a height of 2,524 meters above sea level, and is a peak of the eastern part of the Šar Mountains.

Located on the slopes of Piribeg is the largest ski center in Kosovo, Brezovica.

Notes

References

Šar_Mountains
Two-thousanders of Kosovo
Two-thousanders of North Macedonia